Chelonus elegans is a species of wasp in the family Cheloninae.

References

External links 

 Chelonus elegans at bionames.org

Braconidae
Insects described in 1834